The posterior auricular nerve is a nerve of the head. It is a branch of the facial nerve (CN VII). It communicates with branches from the vagus nerve, the great auricular nerve, and the lesser occipital nerve. Its auricular branch supplies the posterior auricular muscle, the intrinsic muscles of the auricle, and gives sensation to the auricle. Its occipital branch supplies the occipitalis muscle.

Structure 
The posterior auricular nerve arises from the facial nerve (CN VII). It is the first branch outside of the skull. This origin is close to the stylomastoid foramen. It runs upward in front of the mastoid process. It is joined by a branch from the auricular branch of the vagus nerve (CN X). It communicates with the posterior branch of the great auricular nerve, as well as with the lesser occipital nerve.

As it ascends between the external acoustic meatus and mastoid process it divides into auricular and occipital branches.
 The auricular branch travels to the posterior auricular muscle and the intrinsic muscles on the cranial surface of the auricule.
 The occipital branch, the larger branch, passes backward along the superior nuchal line of the occipital bone to the occipitalis muscle.

Function 
The posterior auricular nerve supplies the posterior auricular muscle, and the intrinsic muscles of the auricle. It gives sensation to the auricle. It also supplies the occipitalis muscle.

Clinical significance

Nerve testing 
The posterior auricular nerve can be tested by contraction of the occipitalis muscle, and by sensation in the auricle. This testing is rarely performed.

Biopsy 
The posterior auricular nerve can be biopsied. This can be used to test for leprosy, which can be important in diagnosis.

See also 
 posterior auricular artery

References

External links 
 
 
 http://www.dartmouth.edu/~humananatomy/figures/chapter_47/47-5.HTM

Facial nerve